Axymene traversi is a species of predatory sea snail, a marine gastropod mollusc in the family Muricidae, the rock snails or murex snails.

Distribution
This marine species is endemic to New Zealand.

References

 Powell A W B, New Zealand Mollusca, William Collins Publishers Ltd, Auckland, New Zealand 1979 
 Beu, A.G. 2011 Marine Molluscs of oxygen isotope stages of the last 2 million years in New Zealand. Part 4. Gastropoda (Ptenoglossa, Neogastropoda, Heterobranchia). Journal of the Royal Society of New Zealand 41, 1–153.

Pagodulinae
Gastropods of New Zealand
Gastropods described in 1873